Ian John Norman (5 February, 1939 – 29 May 2014) was an Australian businessman and retail executive.

Career
Norman met his business partner Gerry Harvey when both were working as travelling door-to-door vacuum cleaner salesmen. In 1961, the duo partnered to open their first store in Sydney, which specialised in home appliances and electronics. Their store, which was called Norman Ross, expanded to forty-two stores by 1979, with annual sales of AUS$240 million that year. Harvey and Norman sold the Norman Ross chain to Grace Brothers who subsequently sold the company to Alan Bond in 1982.

The business partners then co-founded Harvey Norman, an Australian independly owned retail chain, that bears their name, in 1982. The new chain offered consumer electronics, furniture, and other household goods. The first store under the newly created name known as "Harvey Norman" opened at a shopping centre in Auburn, New South Wales, in 1982, the same year as the sale.

Forbes, had estimated in 2001, that he was 37th richest person in Australia.

By 2014, Ian Norman, who remained an executive, held 175 million shares of Harvey Norman, a 16.5% stake worth an estimated $560 million. Norman who had previously resided at Darling Point, New South Wales, died from throat cancer at his home at Terrigal, New South Wales on 29 May 2014, at the age of 75.

References

2014 deaths
Australian company founders
Australian business executives
Retail company founders
Australian businesspeople in retailing
1939 births